The Cima della Bondasca or Pizzo del Ferro centrale is a mountain in the Bregaglia Range (Alps), located on the border between Italy and Switzerland. Its summit is the triple watershed between Valle del Ferro (Italy), Val Bondasca and Val d'Albigna (Switzerland).

The Cima della Bondasca is the culminating point of the small range named Pizzi del Ferro, which extends between Passo di Bondo (3168 m) and Colle Masino (3061). The summits are (from west to east):
Pizzo del Ferro occidentale (3267 m)
Cima della Bondasca - Pizzo del Ferro centrale (3289 m)
Torrione del Ferro (3234 m)
Pizzo del Ferro orientale (3199 m)

References

External links
Pizzi del Ferro on Summitpost
Cima della Bondasca on Hikr

Mountains of the Alps
Alpine three-thousanders
Mountains of Switzerland
Mountains of Lombardy
Italy–Switzerland border
International mountains of Europe
Mountains of Graubünden
Bregaglia